Saltonstall Street School is a historic school building located at Canandaigua in Ontario County, New York. The original section of the school was built in 1875, with a major addition constructed in 1890 and is a one-story, polychrome brick structure on a raised basement.  It features a variety of picturesque late 19th century decorative features in the Queen Anne style, such as a multi-gabled roof surmounted by a louvred cupola.  It is a typical example of a late 19th-century ward school, along with the Adelaide Avenue School.

It was listed on the National Register of Historic Places in 1984.

References

School buildings on the National Register of Historic Places in New York (state)
Queen Anne architecture in New York (state)
School buildings completed in 1875
Buildings and structures in Ontario County, New York
National Register of Historic Places in Ontario County, New York